Vat Orange 1 is an orange-hue synthetic anthraquinone vat dye.   It is prepared by dibromination of Dibenzpyrenequinone, also known as Vat Yellow 4.

References

External links 
 More about Vat Orange 1 in chemical book 
 More about Vat Orange 1 in Online Database of Chemicals from Around the World

Anthraquinone dyes
Vat dyes
Bromoarenes
Hexacyclic compounds